Zurabad or Zoor Abad, also rendered as Zuhrabad, may refer to:

Zurabad, alternate name of Jahanabad, Dorud, Lorestan
Zurabad, Razavi Khorasan
Zurabad, Hirmand, Sistan and Baluchestan Province
Zurabad, West Azerbaijan